Asperula, commonly known as woodruff, is a genus of flowering plants in the family Rubiaceae. It contains 194 species and has a wide distribution area from Europe, northern Africa, temperate and subtropical Asia to Australasia.

Species

 Asperula abbreviata (Halacsy) Rech.f.
 Asperula abchasica V.I.Krecz.
 Asperula accrescens Klokov
 Asperula acuminata I.Thomps.
 Asperula affinis Boiss. & A.Huet
 Asperula albiflora Popov
 Asperula ambleia Airy Shaw - Stiff woodruff
 Asperula apuana (Fiori) Arrigoni
 Asperula arcadiensis Sims
 Asperula aristata L.f.
 Asperula arvensis L. - Blue woodruff
 Asperula assamica Meisn.
 Asperula asterocephala Bornm.
 Asperula asthenes Airy Shaw - Trailing Woodruff
 Asperula azerbaidjanica Mam
 Asperula badachschenica Pachom.
 Asperula baenitzii Heldr. ex Boiss.
 Asperula balchanica Bobrov
 Asperula baldaccii (Halacsy) Ehrend.
 Asperula beckiana Degen
 Asperula biebersteinii V.I.Krecz
 Asperula boissieri Heldr. ex Boiss.
 Asperula borbasiana (Korica) Korica
 Asperula bornmuelleri Velen. ex Bornm.
 Asperula boryana (Walp.) Ehrend.
 Asperula botschantzevii Pachom.
 Asperula brachyantha Boiss.
 Asperula brachyphylla Trigas & Iatrou
 Asperula breviflora Boiss.
 Asperula brevifolia Vent.
 Asperula bryoides Stapf
 Asperula calabra (Fiori) Gavioli
 Asperula capitata Kit. ex Schult.
 Asperula capitellata Hausskn. & Bornm.
 Asperula carpatica Morariu
 Asperula charophyton Airy Shaw - Strapleaf woodruff
 Asperula chlorantha Boiss. & Heldr.
 Asperula ciliatula Pachom.
 Asperula cilicia Hausskn. ex Ehrend.
 Asperula comosa Schönb.-Tem.
 Asperula conferta Hook.f. - Common woodruff
 Asperula congesta Tschern.
 Asperula crassifolia L.
 Asperula crassula Greuter & Zaffran
 Asperula cretacea Willd. ex Roem. & Schult.
 Asperula cristata (Sommier & Levier) V.I.Krecz
 Asperula cunninghamii Airy Shaw & Turrill - Twining woodruff
 Asperula cymulosa (Post) Post
 Asperula cynanchica L. - Squinancywort
 Asperula cypria Ehrend.
 Asperula cyrenaica (E.A.Durand & Barratte) Pamp.
 Asperula czukavinae Pachom. & Karim
 Asperula dasyantha Klokov
 Asperula deficiens Viv.
 Asperula diminuta Klokov
 Asperula doerfleri Wettst.
 Asperula elonea Iatrou & Goergiadis
 Asperula euboea (Ehrend.) ined.
 Asperula euryphylla Airy Shaw & Turrill
 Asperula fedtschenkoi Ovcz. & Tschernov
 Asperula fragillima Boiss. & Hausskn.
 Asperula friabilis Schönb.-Tem.
 Asperula galioides M.Bieb.
 Asperula garganica Huter
 Asperula gemella Airy Shaw & Turrill - Twin-leaved bedstraw
 Asperula geminifolia F.Muell.
 Asperula glabrata Tschern.
 Asperula glareosa Ehrend.
 Asperula glomerata (M.Bieb.) Griseb.
 Asperula gobica ined.
 Asperula gorganica Schönb.-Tem. & Ehrend.
 Asperula gracilis C.A.Mey.
 Asperula graveolens M.Bieb. ex Schult. & Schult.f.
 Asperula gunnii Hook.f. - Mountain woodruff
 Asperula gussonei Boiss. - Alpine Woodruff
 Asperula haphneola O.Schwarz
 Asperula hercegovina Degen
 Asperula hexaphylla All.
 Asperula hirsuta Desf.
 Asperula hirta Ramond
 Asperula hoskingii I.Thomps.
 Asperula icarica Ehrend. & Schönb.-Tem.
 Asperula idaea Halacsy
 Asperula inopinata Schönb.-Tem.
 Asperula insignis (Vatke) Ehrend.
 Asperula insolita Pachom.
 Asperula intersita Klokov
 Asperula x jordanii E.P.Perrier & Songeon
 Asperula karategini Pachom. & Karim.
 Asperula kemulariae Manden.
 Asperula kotschyana (Boiss. & Hohen.) Boiss.
 Asperula kovalevskiana Pachom.
 Asperula kryloviana Sergeev
 Asperula lactea (Porta) Brullo
 Asperula laevigata L.
 Asperula lasiantha Nakai - Korean woodruff
 Asperula libanotica Boiss.
 Asperula lilaciflora Boiss.
 Asperula lipskyana V.I.Krecz
 Asperula litardierei Humbert
 Asperula littoralis Sm.
 Asperula lutea Sm.
 Asperula lycia Stapf
 Asperula majoriflora Borbas ex Formanek
 Asperula malevonensis Ehrend. & Schönb.-Tem.
 Asperula markothensis Klokov
 Asperula mazanderanica Ehrend.
 Asperula microphylla Boiss.
 Asperula minima Hook.f.
 Asperula molluginoides (M.Bieb.) Rchb.
 Asperula mungieri Boiss. & Heldr.
 Asperula muscosa Boiss. & Heldr.
 Asperula naufraga Ehrend. & Gutermann
 Asperula neglecta Guss.
 Asperula neilreichii Beck
 Asperula nitida Sm.
 Asperula nuratensis Pachom.
 Asperula oblanceolata I.Thomps.
 Asperula oetaea (Boiss.) Heldr. ex Halacsy
 Asperula ophiolithica Ehrend.
 Asperula oppositifolia Regel & Schmalh.
 Asperula orientalis Boiss. & Hohen. - Blue woodruff
 Asperula pauciflora Tschern.
 Asperula paui Font Quer
 Asperula pedicellata Klokov
 Asperula peloritana C.Brullo
 Asperula perpusilla Hook.f.
 Asperula pestalozzae Boiss.
 Asperula pinifolia (Boiss.) Ehrend. & Schönb.-Tem.
 Asperula podlechii Schönb.-Tem.
 Asperula polymera I.Thomps.
 Asperula pontica Boiss.
 Asperula popovii Schischk.
 Asperula x portae Peruzzi
 Asperula prostrata (Adams) K.Koch
 Asperula pseudochlorantha Ehrend.
 Asperula puberula Halacsy & Sint.
 Asperula pubescens (Willd.) Ehrend.
 Asperula pugionifolia Tschern.
 Asperula pulchella (Podlech) Ehrend. & Schönb.-Tem.
 Asperula pulvinaris Heldr. ex Boiss.
 Asperula pumila Moris
 Asperula purpurea (L.) Ehrend.
 Asperula pusilla Hook.f. - Alpine woodruff
 Asperula rechingeri Ehrend. & Schönb.-Tem.
 Asperula rezaiyensis Schönb.-Tem.
 Asperula rigida Sm.
 Asperula rigidula (Halacsy) Halacsy
 Asperula rumelica Boiss.
 Asperula rupestris Tineo
 Asperula rupicola Jord.
 Asperula samia D.H.Christ & Goeriadis
 Asperula saxicola Ehrend.
 Asperula scabrella Tschern.
 Asperula scoparia Hook.f. - Prickly woodruff
 Asperula scutellaris Vis.
 Asperula semanensis Schönb.-Tem. & Ehrend.
 Asperula serotina (Boiss. & Heldr.) Ehrend.
 Asperula seticornis Boiss.
 Asperula setosa Jaub. & Spach
 Asperula sherardioides Jaub. & Spach
 Asperula sintenisii Asch. ex Bornm.
 Asperula sordide-rosea  Popov 
 Asperula staliana Vis.
 Asperula stricta Boiss.
 Asperula strishovae Pachom. & Karim
 Asperula suavis Fisch.
 Asperula suberosa Sm.
 Asperula subsimplex Hook.f.
 Asperula subulifolia Airy Shaw & Turrill
 Asperula suffruticosa Boiss. & Heldr.
 Asperula supina M.Bieb.
 Asperula syrticola (Miq.) Airy Shaw & Turrill
 Asperula szovitsii Ehrend. & Schönb.-Tem.
 Asperula taurina L. - Pink woodruff
 Asperula taygetea Boiss. & Heldr.
 Asperula tenella Heuff. ex Degen
 Asperula tenuifolia Boiss.
 Asperula tenuissima K.Koch
 Asperula tephrocarpa Czern. ex Popov & Chrshan.
 Asperula tetraphylla (Airy Shaw & Turrill) I.Thomps.
 Asperula tinctoria L. - Dyer's woodruff
 Asperula tournefortii Sieber ex Spreng.
 Asperula tragacanthoides Brullo
 Asperula trichodes J.Gray ex DC.
 Asperula trifida Makino
 Asperula virgata Hub.-Mor. ex Ehrend. & Schönb.-Tem. – Rod-shaped woodruff
 Asperula visianii Korica
 Asperula wettsteinii Adamovic
 Asperula wimmeriana Airy Shaw & Turrill
 Asperula woloszczakii Korica
 Asperula woronowii V.I.Krecz.
 Asperula xylorrhiza Nabelek

References

External links
Asperula in the World Checklist of Rubiaceae

 
Rubiaceae genera